is a Japanese company that mainly operates in the buying and selling of products, notably but not limited to DVDs, CDs, and video games.  

As of June 2022, the company had 971 video rental stores.

See also
 Culture Convenience Club
 Book Off
 HMV Group

References

Video rental services
Companies based in Aichi Prefecture
Companies listed on the Tokyo Stock Exchange